Gerardo Dúran (born October 31, 2003), is an American soccer player.

Club career
After playing with the Portland Timbers academy, Dúran appeared as an 62nd-minute substitute for Portland's USL Championship side Portland Timbers 2 on August 31, 2019 in a 3-1 win over Reno 1868.

References

External links
 

2003 births
Living people
Association football midfielders
American soccer players
Portland Timbers 2 players
Soccer players from Oregon
USL Championship players
Sportspeople from Hillsboro, Oregon
MLS Next Pro players